Ptilotus divaricatus (common name - climbing mulla mulla) is a shrub in the Amaranthaceae family.

Distribution
Ptilotus divaricatus is found only in Western Australia.

Taxonomy
It was first described in 1829 by Charles Gaudichaud-Beaupré as Trichinium divaricatum, but was redescribed in 1868 by Ferdinand von Mueller as belonging to the genus, Ptilotus.

References

External links 

 Ptilotus divaricatus occurrence data from the Australasian Virtual Herbarium

divaricatus
Flora of Western Australia
Taxa named by Charles Gaudichaud-Beaupré
Eudicots of Western Australia
Plants described in 1829